South Barwon is an electoral district of the Legislative Assembly in the Australian state of Victoria. Located in a mixed urban and rural area south of the Barwon River, it covers an area of 621 km², including the Geelong suburbs of Belmont and Grovedale, Waurn Ponds and part of Highton, the coastal centre of Torquay and the rural towns of Barrabool, Bellbrae, Connewarre, Gnarwarre, Modewarre, Moriac and Mount Moriac. The electorate had a population of 52,241 at the 2001 census.

South Barwon was created in 1976 as a predominantly rural seat which was considered safe for the conservative Liberal Party. It was won by Liberal Aurel Smith, formerly the member for Bellarine, upon its inception, and retained for the party by Harley Dickinson upon Smith's retirement in 1982. Dickinson held the seat until 1992, when he quit the party and attempted to retain the seat as an independent, but lost to endorsed Liberal candidate and former television newsreader Alister Paterson. The seat underwent significant demographic change during Paterson's tenure as successive redistributions pushed it further into Geelong.  Major population growth in the traditionally Labor-voting areas of Torquay, Barwon Heads and southern Geelong, caused the seat to become progressively less safe for the Liberal Party. These changes came to a head at the 2002 election, when the Labor Party nominated former Geelong mayor Michael Crutchfield as its candidate, and amidst a statewide landslide victory, he succeeded in taking South Barwon for the first time. Crutchfield was re-elected in 2006, but lost in 2010 to local councillor and Liberal candidate Andrew Katos. Katos was re-elected in 2014 but was defeated by former federal MP Darren Cheeseman in 2018. Katos re-contested South Barwon in 2022 in an attempt to win back his former seat, however Cheeseman easily retained the seat with 59.8% of the two-party-preferred vote, on the back of a 6.8% swing towards Labor. This was the strongest result for Labor in the seat’s history.

Members for South Barwon

Election results

References
 District profile from the Victorian Electoral Commission

1976 establishments in Australia
Electoral districts of Victoria (Australia)
City of Greater Geelong
Surf Coast Shire
Barwon South West (region)